Tall Poppy (foaled 30 January 2005) is a Japanese Thoroughbred racehorse and broodmare. In 2007 she took the JRA Award for Best Two-Year-Old Filly after winning two of her four races including the Hanshin Juvenile Fillies. In the following year she ran second in the Tulip Sho before recording her biggest win in the Yushun Himba. She finished unplaced in seven subsequent and was retired from racing in 2010. She made no impact as a dam of winners.

Background
Tall Poppy is a bay mare with a large white star bred in Hokkaido by Northern Farm. During her racing career she carried the green, white and red colours of U Carrot Farm and was trained by Katsuhiko Sumii.

She was from the third crop of foals sired by Jungle Pocket who won the Tokyo Yushun and the Japan Cup in 2001. He went on to become a very successful breeding stallion whose other foals included Jaguar Mail (Tenno Sho).

Tall Poppys's dam Admire Sunday showed high class form, winning three race and finishing second in the Hanshin Himba Stakes. As a broodmare she also produced Tall Poppy's full sister Aventura who won the Shuka Sho in 2011. She was a granddaughter of the undefeated French mare Madelia.

Racing career

2007: two-year-old season
Tall Poppy began her racing career on 8 July at Hanshin Racecourse in a contest for previously unraced juveniles over 1800 metres in which she finished second to Earnestly, a colt who went on to win several major races including the Takarazuka Kinen. After a break of over three months she returned to the track in October for a maiden race at Kyoto Racecourse and recorded her first victory as she narrowly prevailed from the colt Shining Day. On 11 November at the same track, the filly ran second to the colt Yamanin Kingly (later to win the Sapporo Kinen) in the Kigiku Sho.

At Hanshin on 2 December Tall Poppy raced against all-female competition for the first time when she contested the Hanshin Juvenile Fillies. Ridden by Kenichi Ikezoe, she started the 5.6/1 third favourite behind Odile and Aim At Vip (first and second in the Fantasy Stakes) in an eighteen-runner field. After turning into the straight in eighth place she produced a strong late run to win by a neck and half a length from Reve d'Amour and Aim At Vip.

In the official Japanese rankings for 2007, Tall Poppy was rated the best juvenile filly, one pound ahead of Reve d'Amour and four pounds behind the top-rated colt Goshawk Ken. In January 2018 at the JRA Awards for 2017 Tall Poppy took the JRA Award for Best Two-Year-Old Filly.

2008: three-year-old season

On 8 March at Hanshin, Tall Poppy made her first appearance as a three-year-old in the 1600 metre Tulip Sho (a trial race for the Oka Sho) and finished a close second to Air Pascale. In the Oka Sho over the same course and distance five weeks later 
she started joint-favourite with the Daily Hai Queen Cup winner Little Amapola in a seventeen-runner field. The race resulted in a "blanket finish" which saw the outsider Reginetta narrowly prevailing from F T Maia and So Magic, and although Tall Poppy came home eighth she was only two and  a half lengths behind the winner.

The 69th running of the Yushun Himba over 2400 metres at Tokyo Racecourse on 25 May attracted a field of eighteen, and Tall Poppy was made the 8.7/1 fourth choice in the betting behind Little Amapola, Red Agate (Flora Stakes) and So Magic. The other runners included Black Emblem (Flower Cup), Reginetta, Odile, F T Maia, Air Pascale and Meine Ratsel (Fillies' Revue). After racing in mid division Tall Poppy made a strong run up the inside in the straight and got up in the final strides to win by a head from F T Maia. An enquiry was held into possible interference caused by Tall Poppy as she made her challenge but after 30 minutes of deliberation the judges left the result unchanged.

After a break of almost four months Tall Poppy returned in the Rose Stakes over 1800 metres at Hanshin in September and finished sixth behind Meiner Ratsel. In the Shuka Sho over 2000 metres at Kyoto saw Tall Poppy start the 2.6/1 favourite but come home tenth of the eighteen runners behind Black Emblem. This race resulted in another bunched finish with less than six lengths covering the first sixteen to cross the line and Tall Poppy was only three and a quarter lengths behind the winner.

2009 & 2010: four & five-year-old seasons
Tall Poppy began her third campaign by running unplaced behind Kiss To Heaven in the Nakayama Himba Stakes over 1800 metres at Nakayama Racecourse on 15 March. She was then off the track for seven months before returning in autumn. She failed to recapture her best form as she finished unplaced in the Fuchu Himba Stakes, the Turquoise Stakes and the Aichi Hai.

Tall Poppy remained in training as a five-year-old but made only one appearance, finishing seventeenth of the eighteen runners in the Hanshin Himba Stakes on 10 April.

Breeding record
After her retirement from racing, Tall Poppy became a broodmare, but produced only two recorded foals:

Oriental Poppy, a bay filly, foaled in 2011, sired by King Kamehameha. Failed to win in four races.
unnamed bay filly, 2012, by King Kamehameha.

Pedigree

Tall Poppy was inbred 4 × 4 to Northern Dancer, meaning that this stallion appears twice in the fourth generation of her pedigree.

References

2005 racehorse births
Racehorses bred in Japan
Racehorses trained in Japan
Thoroughbred family 1-p